The International Staff (IS) is a body situated at the North Atlantic Treaty Organization's (NATO) headquarters (HQ) that provides advice, guidance, and administrative support to the national delegations and the North Atlantic Council (NAC).

See also
International Military Staff

References

External links

NATO headquarters